Saint Nicholas High School is Catholic secondary school founded in 1920 by the Congregation of Holy Cross in Nagori, in Bengal (now Kaliganj Upazila, Gazipur District, Bangladesh).

References

Holy Cross secondary schools
Catholic secondary schools in Bangladesh
Schools in Gazipur District
Educational institutions established in 1920
1920 establishments in British India
Education in Gazipur District